Nicola Slater and Coco Vandeweghe were the defending champions, having won the event in 2013, but Vandeweghe chose not to participate. Slater partnered up with Julia Cohen, but they lost in the first round.

Asia Muhammad and Taylor Townsend won the tournament, defeating Irina Falconi and Maria Sanchez in the final, 6–3, 6–1.

Seeds

Draw

References 
 Draw

Boyd Tinsley Women's Clay Court Classic - Doubles